Diana Körner (born 24 September 1944) is a German actress. Outside Germany she is known for her brief appearance as Lieschen in Stanley Kubrick's film Barry Lyndon.

Selected filmography
 Creature with the Blue Hand (1967), as Myrna Emerson
 Morning's at Seven (1968), as Becky
 On the Reeperbahn at Half Past Midnight (1969), as Karin Lauritz
 When Sweet Moonlight Is Sleeping in the Hills (1969), as Becky
 When You're With Me (1970), as Susi
 Red Sun (1970), as Christine
 Die tollkühnen Penner (1971), as Anne
 Was wissen Sie von Titipu? (1972), as Yum-Yum
 The Flying Classroom (1973), as Schwester Beate
  (1975, TV miniseries), as Armgard
 Barry Lyndon (1975), as Lieschen
  (1976), as Martha Comstock
  (1979), as Friedrich's fiancé
 Derrick - Season 7, Episode 2: "Unstillbarer Hunger" (1980, TV), as Helga Wichmann
 Derrick - Season 9, Episode 1: "Eine Rose im Müll" (1982, TV), as Elena Grobmüller
 Bas-Boris Bode (1985, TV miniseries), as Annette Bode
 Orchideen des Wahnsinns (1986), as Vera
 Liebling Kreuzberg - Season 2/3 (1988–1994, TV series), as Prosecutor Rosemarie Monk
  (1990)
 Moving (1991), as Hoffmann
 Nicht von schlechten Eltern (1993–1995, TV series), as Rita Zell
 Der Bulle von Tölz (1996–2002, TV series), as Prosecutor Zirner
 Samt und Seide (2000–2005, TV series), as Hedda Althofer
 Forsthaus Falkenau (2002–2006, TV series), as Dr. Annegret Richter

External links

1944 births
Living people
20th-century German actresses
German film actresses
German stage actresses
German television actresses
People from Salzlandkreis